Corononcodes is a genus of small-headed flies. It is known from South Africa and the Palearctic realm.

Species
 Corononcodes coronatus Speiser, 1920
 Corononcodes dimorpha Barraclough, 2001
 Corononcodes homalostemma Barraclough, 1984
 Corononcodes manningi Barraclough, 2001
 Corononcodes siculus Bezzi, 1923
 Corononcodes ziegleri Kehlmaier, Gharali & Majnon Jahromi, 2014

References

Acroceridae
Nemestrinoidea genera
Taxa named by Paul Gustav Eduard Speiser
Diptera of Africa